Zahid Khan may refer to:

 Zahid Khan (cricketer) (born 2002), Afghan cricketer
 Zahid Khan (politician) (born 1956), Pakistani politician
 Zahid Ali Khan, Indian journalist
 Zahid Ali Akbar Khan, Pakistan Army engineering officer